Abie Grossfeld (born March 1, 1934) is an American gymnastics coach and former gymnast. Grossfeld has represented the United States as a gymnastics competitor or coach in seven Olympic Games, seven World Championships, six Maccabiah Games, and five Pan American Games — in addition to many other major gymnastics events.

Early life
Born in New York City, Grossfeld was an excellent athlete in many sports from a young age.  He won gold medals in two Jr. Olympic Cycling Championships, (1949–50).  He also won the New York City 4 X 50 relay team title at Madison Square Garden in 1949, and the Bronx High School high jump and standing long jump titles in 1949.  Grossfeld was also Captain of his high school swimming team, and competed mostly in the 50 yd. and 100 yd. freestyle events.  In addition, he helped the team as a diver, and also swam and competed unattached in the NYC Boys’ Swimming Championships, winning gold in the 100 and silver in diving in 1949.

He was awarded the “New York Maritime Benevolent Association Medal” in 1951 for saving a human life in peril.  When he was 16 years old, he dove into an ice filled river in New York to save a drowning five-year-old.

Gymnastics career

College

Grossfeld finished 2nd in the individual all-around at the 1957 NCAA Championships (he attended the University of Illinois, class of 1960).  He received a master's degree from the school in 1962. Grossfeld received the Dike Eddleman Athlete of the Year Award for 1959 as a member of the Illinois Fighting Illini men's gymnastics team.

At the NCAAs he won four gold - AA, FX, two HB titles, and three silver and three bronze medals.  He finished in the top three in 10 of 16 events, (1957–59).  At the Big Ten Championships he won seven gold medals - 3 AA, FX, R, PB, & HB (1957–59).  At the national AAU Championships he was four times the horizontal bar champion (1955–61).

World Championships
He competed in the World Championships in 1958, finishing 7th in the team competition and 53rd in the individual all-around.

Four years later, Grossfeld again competed in the World Championships, when the U.S. team placed 6th and Grossfeld finished 85th in the all-around.

Olympics career

Competing

A two-time Olympian for the United States' men's gymnastics team, Grossfeld first competed at the 1956 Melbourne Games.  While the U.S. finished 6th overall in the team competition (271.5 points, only 5 points behind Czechoslovakia for the bronze medal), Grossfeld finished in 39th place in the individual all-around competition (107.75 points).  During the Games, he also placed 13th in the horizontal bar, 23rd in the free-standing exercise, 34th in the rings, 48th in the parallel bars, and 52nd in the pommel horse.

Four years later, at the 1960 Summer Olympics, the U.S. team finished 5th and Grossfeld placed 36th in the all-around.

Coaching
After retiring from international competition, he coached the American gymnasts at the 1964, 1972, 1984, and 1988 Olympics.  His 1984 team, with Mitch Gaylord, won the combined exercises championship.

Pan American Games
He had more success at the Pan American Games, competing in 1955, 1959, and 1963.  He won 15 medals (eight golds; including three for Horizontal Bar championships), including the gold in the individual all-around in 1959.

Maccabiah Games
Grossfeld also dominated at the Maccabiah Games. He competed at the 1953 Maccabiah Games, the 1957 Maccabiah Games (winning 7 golds in 7 events; AA, R, PH, FX, HB, PB, & V), and the 1965 Maccabiah Games (winning four gold medals, four silver medals, and three bronze medals), winning a combined 17 gold medals.

Coaching
After retiring from competition, Grossfeld turned to coaching.  He served as head coach of U.S. men's gymnastics team at five World Championships (1966, 1981, 1983, 1985, and 1987), and head coach of the U.S. team at Pan American Games in 1983 and 1987.

He was also the head coach of the men's team at the 1986 Goodwill Games.

In addition, he coached the U.S. gymnasts in three Maccabiah Games:  1973, 1977 (men and women), and 1981.  His 1981 squad won three team gold medals.

During this time, he also became a professor of physical education and became head gymnastics coach at Southern Connecticut State University, helping the program become one of the best in the country.

He coached four Nissen Award winners (akin to football’s Heisman Trophy), three NCAA Div. II championship teams, 10 Consecutive Eastern Collegiate Conference (EIGL) team championships (1975-’84), and 148 gymnasts who achieved All-American status.

Among those he coached were Peter Kormann, first U.S. Olympic individual gymnastics medalist since 1932; John Crosby, two World Cup individual gold medals; and three Pan American individual gold medal winners (1971 & ’75).

Halls of Fame and awards
In 1959, Grossfeld was voted the University of Illinois’ “Athlete of the Year" and was awarded a Big Ten Medal of Honor for demonstrating joint athletic and academic excellence throughout his college career.

He received the Federation Internationale de Gymnastique Master of Sports Award in 1960.

He was chosen NCAA National Coach of the Year three times (1973, 1975, and 1976).

He was elected to the United States Gymnastics Hall of Fame in 1979.Biography: GROSSFELD, Abie

He was named Gymnastics Federation Coach of the Year in 1984.

Grossfeld, who is Jewish, was inducted into the International Jewish Sports Hall of Fame in 1991.

He received the USA Gymnastics “Spirit of the Flame Award” in 1999.

Grossfeld received the World Acrobatic Society’s Acrobatic Legend Award in 2001.

He was elected into National Judges Frank Cumiskey Hall of Fame.

See also
List of select Jewish gymnasts

References

External links
US Gymnastics Hall of Fame bio
Jews in Sports bio
List of competitive results at Gymn Forum

1934 births
Living people
American male artistic gymnasts
College men's gymnastics coaches in the United States
Sportspeople from New York City
Competitors at the 1953 Maccabiah Games
Competitors at the 1957 Maccabiah Games
Competitors at the 1965 Maccabiah Games
Maccabiah Games medalists in gymnastics
Olympic gymnasts of the United States
Gymnasts at the 1956 Summer Olympics
Gymnasts at the 1960 Summer Olympics
Jewish American sportspeople
Jewish gymnasts
Illinois Fighting Illini men's gymnasts
Maccabiah Games gold medalists for the United States
Maccabiah Games bronze medalists for the United States
Pan American Games gold medalists for the United States
Pan American Games silver medalists for the United States
Pan American Games bronze medalists for the United States
Pan American Games medalists in gymnastics
Gymnasts at the 1955 Pan American Games
Medalists at the 1955 Pan American Games
Medalists at the 1959 Pan American Games
Medalists at the 1963 Pan American Games
International Jewish Sports Hall of Fame inductees
21st-century American Jews